Cinquemilaquarantatre is an album released in June 1972 by Italian singer Mina. Its title (in english, "Five Thousand and Forty") is a reference to the catalog number of the disc (PDU PLD 5040).

Disc Packaging 
The album in its original vinyl release came in green, red, blue, purple, and brown versions of the cover made with three separate inserts that, when closed, would form the image of the cover. For the later digital reprint and online distribution, a simple green rendition was chosen. 

Cassette (PMA 543) and stereo versions (P8A 300843) used further colourings not used for the original vinyl. The Spanish edition (Odean J 064-93.937) has a completely different cover.

Chart Performance 
Mina's self titled album, Mina having released the year before, was still number 1 on Italian charts as Cinquemilaquarantatre released. The album continued to be best selling for 8 weeks, and remained in the top 5 until December 1972 totalling over 700,000 copies.

Track listing

Side A

Side B

Credits

Mina – vocals
Pino Presti – bass/arranger/conductor
Ástor Piazzolla – arranger/conductor in "Suoneranno le sei (Balada para mi muerte)"
Gianni Ferrio – arranger/conductor in "Parole parole"
Tullio De Piscopo - drums
Victor Bacchetta - piano, Hammond organ
Andrea Sacchi - acoustic/electric guitar
Massimo Verardi - acoustic guitar
Nuccio Rinaldis – sound engineer

References 

1972 albums
Mina (Italian singer) albums
Italian-language albums
Albums conducted by Pino Presti
Albums arranged by Pino Presti